Annapurna Maharana (3 November 1917 – 31 December 2012) was an India pro-independence activist active in the Indian independence movement. She was also a prominent social and women's rights activist. Maharana was a close ally of Mohandas Gandhi.

Life
Maharana was born in Odisha on 3 November 1917, the second child of Rama Devi and Gopabandhu Choudhury. Both of her parents were active in the Indian independence movement from the United Kingdom. Maharana began actively campaigning for independence when she was fourteen years old, becoming a supporter of Mohandas Gandhi. In 1934, she joined Gandhi on his "Harijan Pada Yatra" march through Odisha from Puri to Bhadrak. Maharana was arrested several times by British and British Raj, including August 1942 during the Quit India Movement civil disobedience campaign.

Following independence, Maharana advocated on behalf of women and children in India. She opened a school in Odisha's Rayagada district for the children of the area's tribal population. Maharana also became involved with the Bhoodan movement, or Land Gift Movement, started by Vinoba Bhave. She further campaigned to integrate the Dacoits active of the Chambal Valley.

During the emergency she protested by helping Ramadevi Choudhury with their newspaper published by the Gram Sevak Press. The newspaper was banned by the government and was arrested along with Ramadevi Choudhury and other leaders from Orissa like Nabakrushna Choudhuri, Harekrushna Mahatab, Manmohan Chowdhury, Jaykrushana Mohanty and others.

The Central University of Odisha awarded Maharana an Honoris Causa (honorary degree) in a ceremony held at her Cuttack home on 19 August 2012.

Maharana died of lengthy illnesses related to old age at her home in Bakharabad, Cuttack, Odisha, at 10:30 p.m. on 31 December 2012, at the age of 96. She was survived by two of her sons. Her late husband, Sarat Maharana, died in 2009. She was cremated with honors at the Khannagar crematorium in Cuttack on 2 January 2013.

Governor of Odisha Murlidhar Chandrakant Bhandare and Chief Minister Naveen Patnaik described her death as "irreparable loss" to India and Odisha.

References

1917 births
2012 deaths
Indian independence activists from Odisha
Indian women's rights activists
People from Cuttack
Women educators from Odisha
Indians imprisoned during the Emergency (India)
Prisoners and detainees of British India
Indian reformers
Women Indian independence activists
Indian women publishers
Indian publishers (people)
20th-century Indian journalists
20th-century Indian women writers
Indian women journalists
21st-century Indian women writers
21st-century Indian journalists
Indian newspaper journalists
Women writers from Odisha
Journalists from Odisha
Educators from Odisha